Yerlan Yerlesuly Sagymbayev (Erlan Erlesūly Sağymbaev; born April 5, 1970) is a Kazakhstani former professional ice hockey player, and head coach.

Playing career
Yerlan Sagymbayev is a graduate of the Ust-Kamenogorsk ice hockey school. He is a two-time champion of the USSR Junior Championships in the squad of the Torpedo Ust-Kamenogorsk. In 1987, he awarded as a best young  forward and invited to the USSR national youth team. In 1988, he was a bronze medalist of the Viking Cup in Calgary. After Soviet Union collapse, he played for the Kazakhstan national ice hockey team. He served as captain at the 1998 Winter Olympics in Nagano, where his team achieved a quarter final. He ended his career because of injury in 2001.

Career statistics

Regular season and playoffs

International

Coaching career
2004–2005 Kazakhstan U20 National Team - assistant coach
2005–2006 Kazakhstan U20 National Team - head coach
2006–2008 Kazzinc-Torpedo - head coach
2009–2011 Yertis Pavlodar - head coach
2011–2012 Kazakhstan U20 National Team - head coach
2012–2014 Barys Astana - assistant coach
2014–2015 Snezhnye Barsy - assistant coach
2015–present Barys Astana - head coach

External links
 

1970 births
Avangard Omsk players
Avtomobilist Karagandy players
Metallurg Novokuznetsk players
HC Sibir Novosibirsk players
Ice hockey players at the 1998 Winter Olympics
Kazakhstan men's national ice hockey team coaches
Kazakhstani ice hockey coaches
Kazakhstani ice hockey right wingers
Kazzinc-Torpedo head coaches
Kazzinc-Torpedo players
Living people
Olympic ice hockey players of Kazakhstan
Sportspeople from Oskemen
Soviet ice hockey right wingers
Asian Games gold medalists for Kazakhstan
Medalists at the 1996 Asian Winter Games
Medalists at the 1999 Asian Winter Games
Asian Games medalists in ice hockey
Ice hockey players at the 1996 Asian Winter Games
Ice hockey players at the 1999 Asian Winter Games